is a Buddhist temple in Ichihara, Chiba, Japan, belonging to the Shingon-shu Buzan-ha sect, and is the  provincial temple ("kokubunji") of former Kazusa Province. The present temple is of uncertain foundation, but claims to be the direct descendant of the original Nara period kokubunji temple which fell into ruins sometime in the Muromachi period. The Nara-period temple ruins were designated a National Historic Site in 1929, with the area under protection expanded in 1979 due to additional archaeological finds.

Overview

The Kazusa Kokubun-ji was located on the northern bank of the Yōrō River, in an area with a high concentration of kofun and ancient sites. The ancient temple is mentioned in historical records to the Oei era (1394-1427), but appears to have fallen into ruin after then. It was revived during the Edo period during the Genroku era (1688-1704) and the current main hall, a Yakushi-dō, was built in 1716 on the site of the old temple. The temple's Niōmon also dates from the Edo period, but one of the statues within is a survivor from the Nanboku-chō period.

Ancient Kazusa Kokubun-ji
The remains of original kokubunji overlap with the current temple precincts. The temple area for the ancient Kazusa Kokubun-ji is not square because there are valleys and burial mounds around it. Roughly, it measured 478 meters north-to-south by between 254 meters and 345 meters from east-to-west, for a total area of 139,000 square meters. The inner compound containing the main buildings of the temple was 219 meters north-to-south by 194 meters east-to-west, and unlike other kokubunji temples, did not adhere to the standardized layout, but was patterned instead after Daian-ji in Asuka.

The site was located in 1929 with the discovery of large number of roof tiles inscribed "kokubun-ji" in the location. An archaeological excavation in 1966 confirmed the foundation stones for the Kondō, and Lecture Hall, and the middle gate as well as that of a pagoda. From the size of the foundations for the pagoda, it is estimated that the completed structure was a seven-story building with a height of around 60-meters. The remains of a group of kilns for producing roof tiles were located in a survey conducted in 1974 to the west of the main temple complex.
The temple site is located a 15-minute walk from Kazusa-Murakami Station on the Kominato Railway Kominato Line.

See also
Provincial temple
List of Historic Sites of Japan (Chiba)

References

External links

Chiba Prefectural Board of Education 
Ichihara City home page 

Buddhist temples in Chiba Prefecture
Nara period
Ichihara, Chiba
History of Chiba Prefecture
Historic Sites of Japan
Kazusa Province
8th-century establishments in Japan
8th-century Buddhist temples
Buddhist archaeological sites in Japan